Ostrów Tumski is the oldest part of the city of Wrocław in south-western Poland. It was formerly an island (ostrów in Old Polish language) between branches of the Oder River.

History
Archaeological excavations have shown that the western part of Ostrów Tumski, between the Church of St. Martin and the Holy Cross, was the first area to be inhabited. The first, wooden church (St. Martin), dating from the 10th century, was surrounded by defensive walls built on the banks of the river. The island had approximately 1,500 inhabitants at that time.

The first constructions on Ostrów Tumski were built in the 10th century by the Piast dynasty, and were made from wood. The first building from solid material was St. Martin's chapel, built probably at the beginning of the eleventh century by Benedictine monks. Not long after the first cathedral was raised, in place of the small church. Religious buildings appeared in Ostrów Tumski because during the Congress of Gniezno in AD 1000, it was decided to create a bishopric in Wrocław.

In 1163 the settlement was raided by Boleslaw I the Tall who had returned from his banishment. After taking control of the area and waiting for the political situation in Silesia to stabilize, he chose Ostrów Tumski as his new capital. He began replacing the wooden defenses with brick ones and build a Roman-style residence.

In 1315 Ostrów Tumski was sold to the church. Since the island ceased to be under secular jurisdiction, it was often used by those who had broken the law in Wrocław, as a place of sanctuary. An interesting indication of the special status of the island was a ban on wearing any headdress by men, effective even on Tumski Bridge beyond the border pole of this small "ecclesiastical nation" (the law also applied to royalty).

In 1503-1538 Nicolaus Copernicus was a canon of the collegiate chapter of the Holy Cross at Ostrów Tumski. 

In 1766 at Ostrów Tumski, Giacomo Casanova lived at the house of Father Bastiani.

Gallery

See also 
Domfreiheit

References

External links 
 
  Ostrów Tumski we Wrocławiu - Wyspa Katedralna

Districts of Wrocław
Tourist attractions in Wrocław